NRBB is the biggest Roller Hockey Clubs Championship in Benelux.
In 2015 is disputed by teams from EHRC Marathon, RV Brunssum/ZRC, RC de Lichtstad and Valkenswaardse RC	from Netherlands, and Kon Modern RCW from Belgium.

List of Winners

Number of Championships by team

References

External links
 2011 season

Dutch websites
Netherlands Rolhockey

Dutch Teams websites
Valkenswaardse RC
EHRC Marathon
RC Brunssum
Eerste Dordtse Rolschaats Club Alles Gaat Op Rolletjes EDRC AGOR
Zaanse Roller club
RC de Lichtstad

International
HoqueiPatins.cat Rink Hockey Database
 Roller Hockey links worldwide
Forum of Roller Hockey in English
 Mundook-World Roller Hockey
Hardballhock-World Roller Hockey
Inforoller World Roller Hockey
 World Roller Hockey Blog
rink-hockey-news - World Roller Hockey

Roller hockey competitions in the Netherlands
National roller hockey championships
Recurring sporting events established in 1946
1946 establishments in the Netherlands
National championships in the Netherlands